William Delafield Arnold (7 April 1828 – 9 April 1859) was a British author and colonial administrator.

He was the fourth son of Thomas Arnold who was the headmaster of Rugby School. His older brothers included the poet and critic Matthew Arnold and the literary scholar Tom Arnold. Not long after his father's death in 1842, William, a pupil at Rugby School, was part of a committee of three, Arnold, W. W. Shirley and Frederick Hutchins, that drew up the first written rules for football at Rugby School. These rules were approved in August 1845 and published that same year, becoming the first known published set of rules for any code of football. Later, William served as an educational administrator (during 1855) in Punjab, in British India; as the first director of public instruction in the Punjab, he was responsible for implementing "Halkabandi" in that province. One of his most significant achievements was to enact a law separating church and state in public schools. As a result, Hindu pupils who attended these schools were no longer required to study the Bible or the Koran in public schools. This policy would later influence public schools in England as well. While working in India, William wrote several articles for "Fraser's Magazine," mainly concerning "the India question" (see bibliography). In 1853, William published a novel of Anglo-Indian life, Oakfield; or, Fellowship in the East, which explores commonalities between spiritual traditions of the East and the West, while also predicting the "mutiny" that would occur soon afterward. The main character of Oakfield is dying of disease contracted in India; its author was afflicted with the same disease. William died aged thirty-one, at Gibraltar, on his way home from India. Matthew Arnold's poem "A Southern Night" mourns his early death. William's orphaned children were adopted by his sister Jane Martha and her husband William Edward Forster.

His eldest son Edward Penrose Arnold-Forster (1851 – 18 January 1927) was a manufacturer in Yorkshire and deputy lieutenant for the West Riding. Another son, Hugh Oakeley Arnold-Forster, became a Cabinet minister in Arthur Balfour's government.

References
Author and Bookinfo.com
 Trilling, Lionel (1939) Matthew Arnold.  London: George Allen & Unwin Ltd.
 Gander Ostrander, Diana L., Ph.D. An Anglo-Indian in Search of Wisdom: W. D. Arnold's India Pilgrimage. University of Minnesota, 2007, 237 pages; AAT 3252500.
 Gander Ostrander, Diana L., Ph.D. "Wordsworth in the Himalayas: Indian Narratology and Sacred Space in William Delafield Arnold's Oakfield: Fellowship in the East." Religion and the Arts 14.1–2 (2010): 34–58. Print.
 Arnold, William Delafield.  “An Anglo-Indian Lament for John Company.”  Fraser’s Magazine, Vol. 57, No. 342. May 1858, 635–642.
 "An Anglo-Indian View of the Indian Crisis.” Fraser’s Magazine Vol. 57, No. 339, March 1858, 269–282.
 “An Anglo-Indian View of the Indian Crisis: The Second Part.” Fraser’s Magazine Vol. 57, No. 340, April 1858, 473–487.
 “The Curate of Edenholm.” Fraser’s Magazine. Volume 57, 473–480.
 German Letter on English Education, by Dr. L. Wiese. Translated by W.D. Arnold. Longmans, 1854.
 Essay. Short Essays on Social and Indian Subjects Calcutta, 1869, 156–73.
 “How Queen Victoria Was Proclaimed at Peshawar.” Fraser’s Magazine, Vol. 59, January 1859, 120–126.
 “India in a Mess.” Fraser’s Magazine, Vol. 58, No. 348. December 1858, 730–741.
 “India in Mourning: From the Punjab, September 29, 1857.” Fraser’s Magazine. Vol. 56. December 1857, 737–750.
 “Jack Sepoy.” Fraser’s Magazine, Vol. 54, No. 321. September 1856, 359–362.
 “Lord Dalhousie.”  Fraser’s Magazine, Vol. 52, No. 308. July 1855, 123–135.
 “Memorandum as to a Central College at Lahore.” 21 January 1856, No. 236 OIOC [Oriental and India Office Collection] P/201/53.
 "The Night Mail Train in India." Fraser's Magazine, Vol. 54, December 1856, 680–684.
 Oakfield: Fellowship in the East. Edited by Kenneth Allott. Leicester: 	Leicester UP, 1973.
 “An Overland Mail Adventure.” Fraser’s Magazine. Vol. 54, No. 319. July 1856, 111–121.
 “Progress of the India Question.” Fraser’s Magazine. Vol. 47, Number 3089. March 1853, 473–484.
 “Protestantism: Zwingle and His Times.” Fraser’s Magazine Vol. 53, March 1856, 326–341.
 The Palace of Westminster, and Other Historical Sketches. London, 1855.
 “What is the Indian Question?”  Fraser’s Magazine. Vol. 47, No. 3089. March 1853, 473–484.

Specific

External links
 "Oakfield: Fellowship in the East", novel by William Delafield Arnold:
  Vol. 1
  Vol. 2

1828 births
1859 deaths
British people of Cornish descent
People from Rugby, Warwickshire
People educated at Rugby School
English male novelists
19th-century English novelists
19th-century English male writers